Nagpuri culture refers to the culture of the Nagpuria people, the native speakers of the Nagpuri language, which includes literature, festivals, folk song and dance. It is also referred to as the culture related to the Nagpuri language.

Language

Nagpuri is the native language of Sadan, the Indo-Aryan ethnolinguistic group of Chotanagpur. It is spoken in the western and central Chota Nagpur plateau region. It is spoken by around 12 million people, 5 million as a native language and 7 million as a second language. The evidence of poetry writing in the language is from the 17th century. The Nagvanshi king Raghunath Shah and Dalel Singh, the king of Ramgarh were poet. Some prominent poets were Hanuman Singh, Jaigovind Mishra, Barju Ram Pathak, Ghasiram Mahli and Das Mahli. Some prominent writers in modern the period are Praful Kumar Rai, Lal Ranvijay Nath Shahdeo, Bisheshwar Prasad Keshari, Girdhari Ram Gonjhu and Sahani Upendra Pal Singh.

Festivals
Several festivals are observed by Sadans including Ashadhi Puja, Karam, Jitiya, Nawakhani, Sohrai/Diwali, Surjahi Puja, Makar Sankranti, Fagun, Bad Pahari and Sarhul.

Folk music and dance

Folk dance
Paiki is ceremonial martial folk dance performed in marriage and functions of Sadan community. The musical instruments used are dhol, mandar, bansi, nagara, dhak, shehnai, khartal, and narsinga. These musical instruments are traditionally made by Ghasi and Mahli community. Akhra is important part of Nagpuri culture which where people dance in village. Ghasi community have played important role in preservation of folk music. They have been playing musical instruments in marriage ceremony.

Folk song
Folk songs are songs sung by people since time immemorial. These songs are composed by different people during different periods. Nagpuri folk songs can be divided into four categories, such as seasonal, festival, Sanskar and dance songs. Seasonal songs are sung according to season such as Udasi, Pawas, Fagua. Festival songs are sung during festivals such as Karam, Jitiya, Teej, Sohrai etc. Sanskar songs are sung during from major rites such as child birth and weddings. Dance songs are dance oriented such as Mardani Jhumar, Janani Jhumar, Domkach and Khemta.

Theth Nagpuri is a genre of typical Nagpuri music which is based on traditional ragas of folk songs such as Jhumar, Pawas, Udasi and Fagua. It is connected to Nagpuri tradition. Notable exponent of Nagpuri folk music and dance are Govind Sharan Lohra, Mahavir Nayak and Mukund Nayak.

Cuisine

The Staple food of the region is rice. People also eat forest products such as wild flowers and fruits. Some traditional dishes are Chhilka Roti, Arsa roti, Malpua, Dhooska, Til laddu, Dudhauri etc. Some traditional leafy vegetables or Saag are Khesari, Kohnda, Koinar, Methi, Munga, Poi, Putkal and Sarla saag. Some wild edible wild flowers are as Jilhur phool and Sanai phool (Crotalaria juncea). Gunda is a traditional dish which is a powder of leafy vegetables which are dried and grinded  and made into soup with rice water. Some Gunda are Chakod gunda, Munga Gunda and Sarla gunda etc. Karil, the new bamboo shoots are edible. Some edible mushrooms are khukdi, especially the white mushroom, Putu (white puffball) and rugda (puffball), which grow during the rainy season in field and forest. Mahua flower is edible and its seed used for preparation of oil. The traditional alcoholic beverage are Handi, a rice bear and Mahua daru, a wine prepared by Mahua flowers. People drink it during festivals and marriage feasts.

Clothes
The traditional clothes of Sadan are Dhoti, Sari, Kurta and Chadar. But in the modern age, shirts, pants, coats are also worn.

Traditional clothes, Laal Paad, made by Chik Baraik in Chotanagpur. People wear them at traditional festivals and functions.

Religion
Sadan people observe festivals such as Asari, Karam, Jitiya, Nawakhani, Sohrai , Fagun and Bad Pahari. In these festivals elder of family member  propitates Sun, Moon, ancestors and other deities by offering sacrifices and liquor.  In the village festival, the rituals are performed by the village priest "Pahan" and his assistant "Pujar", who offer sacrifice to village deity. According to scholars, the deities which are not found in Hindu scriptures are deities of  folk tradition which is a non-vedic  tradition. According to June McDaniel, folk Hinduism is based on local traditions and cults of local deities and is the oldest, non-literate system. It is a pre-vedic tradition extending back to prehistoric times, or before the writing of the Vedas. The influence of Vedic religion reached in the region during the reign of the Nagvanshi.  The Nagvanshi kings constructed several temples during their reign and invited Brahmins from different parts of the country for priestly duties. But rituals in the village are carried out by village priest Pahan.

Megasthenes, the Greek Ambassador to Maurya, Emperor Chandragupta Maurya, mentioned India in his book Indica. According to him, Indians make wine from rice, drink rice bear in sacrifice and mainly eat rice pottage.
In 1989, the Jharkhand Co-ordination committee (JCC), who was instrumental in the demand for a separate Jharkhand state in front of the central government, also stated in their paper that Sadan may be the earliest Aryan population and could be the subcategoriable as Naga people as they differ from dominant Aryan group and did't strictly follow Brahmanical religion.

Marriage tradition
Nagpuri weddings are held for several days. Prior to marriage, the groom's relatives go bride's home to see and negotiate for marriage and a token amount (bride price) is paid by the groom's family to the family of the bride. Some wedding rituals are madwa, baraat, parghani, sindoordan, bidai etc. Domkach folk dance is performed during the wedding. The musical instruments used in the nagpuri wedding are nagara, dhak and  shehnai.

The practice of bride price was mentioned in Ramayana and Mahabharata where during weddings of Kaikeyi, Gandhari and Madri, bride price was given. The practice of giving bride price was considered Asura Vivah in Smriti texts such as Grihas Sutra and Dharma Sutra.

Traditional administrative System
In Chotoanagpur, there was a traditional administrative system to govern villages known as to the Parha system. In the Parha system, there were the posts of  Mahto (village chief), Pahan (village priest), Pujar or Pani bharwa (assistant of Pahan), Bhandari (treasurer), Chowkidar (watchman), Diwan (minister) and Raja (king). During the reign of Nagvanshi, the landowners were known as Bhuinhar. Bhuinhar refers to the first people who cleared forest, built farmland and houses in a village. Sadans were in the post of Diwan, Thakur, Pandey, Karta (executive), Lal, Mahato, Pahan and Raja.

The owner of lands known as Bhuinhars.
Mahto made assessments and settlement of all land not held by hereditary cultivators. He collects rent. Pahan, the village priest, does all the rituals for village deities. Bhandari assists with the of rents and summoning ryots who work for farmers or Zamindars. There was Gorait, who was a messenger to Zamindar, and Kotwar, who was a police officer in each village. The village has a blacksmith and a Gowala who rear the cattle of the village.

Cinema

Nagpuri language films have been produced since 1992. Sona Kar Nagpur (1992) was the first nagpuri film produced and directed by Dhananjay Nath Tiwari. The Nagpuri cinema faces several challenges, such as lack of funds and lack of infrastructure, as the majority of the audience reside in villages. Despite all these, several films are produced per year and few get released.

See also
Culture of Jharkhand
Culture of India

References 

Culture of Jharkhand
Indian culture
Nagpuri culture
Nagpuria people